Siberian State University of Water Transport is a state university in Zheleznodorozhny District of  Novosibirsk, Russia. It was founded in 1951.

History
On May 15, 1951, the Novosibirsk Institute of Water Transport Engineers was established.

From 1994 to 2015, it was called Novosibirsk State Academy of Water Transport.

In 2015, the academy was renamed into Siberian State University of Water Transport.

Faculties
 Electromechanical Faculty
 Ship-Mechanical Faculty
 Hydraulic Engineering Faculty
 Navigation Faculty
 Water Transport Management
 Extramural Faculty

Branches
The structure of the university includes branches in Omsk, Krasnoyarsk, Khabarovsk, Ust-Kut and Yakutsk.

Notable alumni
 Vasily Yurchenko (born 1960), Russian politician, the governor of Novosibirsk Oblast (2010—2014).
 Anna Kikina (born 1984), Russian engineer and test cosmonaut.

External links 
 Siberian State University of Water Transport. The Ministry of Transport of the Russian Federation.

Education in Novosibirsk
Zheleznodorozhny City District, Novosibirsk
Educational institutions established in 1951
1951 establishments in the Soviet Union
Universities in Novosibirsk Oblast
Cultural heritage monuments of regional significance in Novosibirsk Oblast